Anime Central (ACen) is an annual three-day anime convention held during May at the Hyatt Regency O'Hare & Donald E. Stephens Convention Center in Rosemont, Illinois. The convention is organized by the Midwest Animation Promotion Society (MAPS).

Programming
The convention typically offers anime viewing rooms, artist alley, autograph sessions, concerts, dances/rave, dealer's room, gaming (arcade, role play, table top, trading card, video) formal ball, karaoke, masquerade, panels, and Q&As. During the convention, the gaming room runs for 24-hour a day.

History
Anime Central was formed in 1998 due to the lack of anime gatherings in the Central United States. During the 2001 convention, construction was occurring at the hotel while the event was underway. Guest Robert DeJesus got married by guest Jan Scott-Frazier, an ordained minister, during the convention. At the 2003 convention, the weekend lines to register for the convention ranged from 90 minutes for pre-registered attendees to 3 hours for others. In 2004 several scheduling problems occurred and opening ceremonies were delayed an hour due to audio-visual problems. The convention experienced problems with its registration system in 2008 resulting in extremely long lines. Two cosplay weddings were held at the convention in 2012, along with the Hyatt needing to be evacuated due to a fire alarm. Anime Central hosted the 2014 US Finals for the World Cosplay Summit.

Anime Central 2020 and 2021 were cancelled due to the COVID-19 pandemic. The convention in 2022 changed its COVID-19 policies shortly before the convention, no longer requiring masks or vaccination. Due to poor feedback from attendees, the policy was later modified requiring masks in several areas.

Event history

Anime Central Aftershock!
Anime Central Aftershock! was a programming track offered at the Chicago Comic-Con on August 6–9, 2009. Programming included anime showings, artist appearances, contests, cosplay, and panel events.

Otaquest Connect
Anime Central partnered with Otaquest to hold an online anime convention on August 15–16, 2020.

References

External links
 Anime Central Website

1998 establishments in Illinois
Anime conventions in the United States
Annual events in Illinois
Festivals in Illinois
Recurring events established in 1998
Tourist attractions in Cook County, Illinois
Conventions in Illinois
Rosemont, Illinois